Popple may refer to:

Places

South Africa 
 Popple Peak, a mountain in the Drakensberg range

United States 
 Popple, Michigan, a community in Colfax Township, Huron County, Michigan
 Popple Grove Township, Mahnomen County, Minnesota
 Popple River (Minnesota)
 Popple River, Wisconsin, a town in Forest County, Wisconsin
 Popple River (Pine River), a tributary of the Pine River, Wisconsin
 Popple Township, Clearwater County, Minnesota

People 
 James Popple (born 1964), Australian CEO, lawyer, computer scientist, public servant and academic
 William Popple (1638–1708), English Unitarian merchant and translator
 William Popple (colonial administrator) (1701–1764), English official, dramatist and Governor of Bermuda, son of the previous

Other uses 
 Popple, a character from Mario & Luigi: Superstar Saga
 Poplar, woody plants of the genus Populus; sometimes referred to as "Popples"
 Popple, northern English regional name for the corncockle or for various other cornfield weeds, like the corn poppy or the charlock
 Popples, a 1980s toy line and cartoon show

See also
 Poppler (disambiguation)
 Poppleton (disambiguation)
 Poppel (disambiguation)